Achillea clavennae, the silvery yarrow,  is a herbaceous perennial flowering plant in the sunflower family. The species name (clavennae) honors the Italian botanist N. Clavena (17th century).

Description
This plant blooms from June to August, producing many loose clusters.

Distribution
This species is native to Central Europe, the eastern Alps, the southern Alps up to the Balkan Peninsula.

Habitat
This plant prefers sunny slopes in mountain regions.

References

clavennae
Flora of Europe
Plants described in 1753
Taxa named by Carl Linnaeus